James L. Davis (July 28, 1928 – November 27, 2012) was an American politician.

Born in Frankfort, Indiana, Davis served in the United States Marine Corps during World War II. He then graduated from Purdue University. Davis served in the Indiana House of Representatives 1982–1998. He died in Frankfort, Indiana.

Notes

1928 births
2012 deaths
People from Frankfort, Indiana
Purdue University alumni
Members of the Indiana House of Representatives